Free Ride is an album by trumpeter Dizzy Gillespie which was composed, arranged and conducted by Lalo Schifrin, recorded in 1977 and released on the Pablo label. The album represents the first collaboration between the two since The New Continent in 1962.

Reception
The AllMusic review stated "The things that make Schifrin an anathema to the diehards -- the huge orchestras, the pop and soul riffs, the general air of over the top theatricality -- are all over 1977's Free Ride, his reunion date with Dizzy Gillespie... it's very much a record of and for its time".

Track listing
All compositions by Lalo Schifrin
 "Unicorn" - 6:48 
 "Fire Dance" - 4:25 
 "Incantation" - 6:40 
 "Wrong Number" - 4:36 
 "Free Ride" - 5:22 
 "Ozone Madness" - 6:34 
 "Love Poem for Donna" - 4:33 
 "The Last Stroke of Midnight" - 4:29

Personnel
Dizzy Gillespie - trumpet
Lalo Schifrin - keyboards, arranger, conductor
Oscar Brashear, Jack H. Laubach - trumpet
Lew McCreary - trombone
Jerome Richardson - flute
Ernie Watts - saxophone
James Horn -  saxophone, flute
Sonny Burke - piano, electric piano
Charles E. Spangler - synthesizer
Ray Parker Jr., Lee Ritenour, Wah Wah Watson - guitar
Wilton Felder - bass
Ed Greene - drums
Paulinho Da Costa - percussion

References 

Pablo Records albums
Dizzy Gillespie albums
Albums produced by Norman Granz
Albums arranged by Lalo Schifrin
Albums conducted by Lalo Schifrin
1977 albums